Body and Soul is a 1981 American sports drama film written by and starring Leon Isaac Kennedy and co-starring Jayne Kennedy. Directed by George Bowers, it is a remake of the 1947 film of the same name.

Plot
Leon Johnson (Leon Isaac Kennedy) is a boxer who plans to study medicine, but, with his ailing sister, Kelly (Nikki Swassy), in need of costly care, he decides to earn a living in the ring. His rise is rapid, but Leon's newly extravagant lifestyle threatens his relationship with girlfriend Julie (Jayne Kennedy). As Leon approaches the sport's highest echelons, he faces increasingly tough decisions that test his loyalty to his family and himself.

Cast
 Leon Isaac Kennedy as Leon Johnson
 Jayne Kennedy as Julie Winters
 Perry Lang as Charles Golphin
 Nikki Swasey as Kelly Johnson
 Michael V. Gazzo as Frankie
 Kim Hamilton as Mrs. Johnson
 Muhammad Ali as himself
 Peter Lawford as Big Man
 Gilbert Lewis as Tony
 J.B. Williamson as St. Louis Assassin
 Mel Welles as Joe Gillardi
 Danny Wells as Sports Announcer #1
 Johnny Brown as Sports Announcer #2
 Rosanne Katon as Melody
 Eddie Mustafa Muhammad as himself
 Jimmy Lennon as himself

References

External links
 
 

1981 films
American boxing films
Remakes of American films
African-American drama films
1980s sports drama films
Golan-Globus films
1981 drama films
1980s English-language films
Films produced by Menahem Golan
Films produced by Yoram Globus
Films directed by George Bowers
1980s American films